The Absence of Mr Sugden is a 1965 Australian TV play. It was the fifth drama to be .made at the ABC's Toowong studios and the second one in 1965. It was shot on 9 December 1965 using an all-male cast of six.

A copy of the production is at the National Archives of Australia.

Premise
Three burglars plan a robbery.

Cast
Edward Howell
Stanley Smith
John Nash
Don McTaggart
Reg Cameron
Vic Hughes

Production
It was written by Sydney writer Ron Harrison and was directed by Bob Cubbage, the ABC's supervisor of drama and features in Queensland. Sydney actor Edward Howell had been in another Brisbane shot play Ring Out Wild Bells.

See also
Vacancy in Vaughan Street (1963)
Dark Brown (1963)
The Quiet Season (1965)
Ring Out Wild Bells (1965)
Arabesque for Atoms (1965)
A Sleep of Prisoners (1961)
The Monkey Cage (1966)

References

1965 television plays
1965 Australian television episodes